The Consulate General of Nigeria, Frankfurt is a Nigerian diplomatic mission in Germany established in 2013. It is the first and only Nigerian Consulate Office in Europe. It is located at Weissfrauenstrasse 12, D-60311, Frankfurt am Main, with jurisdiction comprising five states in the South of Germany. The consulate is currently headed by Ambassador Wahab Adekola Akande who is the Consul General.

Brief History
The Consulate General of Nigeria in Frankfurt was created in 2013. It is one of the 13 Consulates General and Consulates of Nigeria worldwide. The consulate was established to promote bilateral relations and cater to the Nigerian residents in some states in the Southern region of Germany through consular services. It also facilitates trade and fosters the good bilateral relationship between Nigeria and Germany. It provides various services which include passport services (including Tourist, Business, Temporary permit, Diplomatic/Official and Transit Visa), travel visas and attestation and legalization of documents of individuals and companies. It also provides assistance with bureaucratic issues to both Nigerians travelling or living in Germany and to German citizens who wish to travel to or trade with Nigeria.

Nigerians in Frankfurt and environs
Nigerians are the largest sub-Saharan African group in Germany. According to a March 2017 data report from the Federal Bureau of Statistics, more than 56,000 Nigerians lived in Germany. However, it is generally assumed that there are more than 60,000 Nigerians in Germany. A large community of them are within the consular jurisdiction, which necessitated the opening of the Consulate General in Frankfurt. 

Historically, the first Nigerians in Germany arrived on study visas - with scholarships from the German government in support of Nigeria's post-independence development efforts. The outbreak of the Nigerian Civil War subsequently witnessed some Nigerians seeking asylum in Germany. At the end of the war, migration for scholarship continued. German companies with projects in Nigeria also brought in some Nigerian for training in Germany in fulfilment of contract terms for technical knowledge transfer for such projects.

A large number of Nigerians in Germany are professionals: doctors, engineers, IT specialists, academics, entrepreneurs, students, etc. There are also normal workers in different sectors of the German economy. A lot of them live in the country on temporary residence status.

Most Nigerians reside in major cities and are easily reachable through places of worship, cultural/tribal associations and social groupings. Many are also organized in professional groups like Nigerian Scholars in Germany, Nigerian Medical Association, etc. There are umbrella associations like the Nigerians in Diaspora Organization in Germany and the Nigerian Community in Germany, which was formed in 1990 and incorporated in Bonn (1992). Both organizations have branches in Frankfurt.

Consular Jurisdiction
The Consular Jurisdiction of the Nigeria Consulate in Frankfurt comprises five states in the South of Germany, namely; Hesse, the State Rhineland-Palatinate, Baden-Württemberg, the Free State of Bavaria, North Rhine-Westphalia. Major cities within the consular jurisdiction include Dusseldorf, Heidelberg, and Wiesbaden, Dortmund, Sindelfingen, Meinheim, among others.

Consulate services

The Consulate
The consulate is open for consular services from Monday to Thursday between 10:00 am to 3:00 pm for the processing of documents and 3:00 pm to 5:00 pm for the collection of documents. It provides four major services: passport services, visa services, emergency travel certificates and citizenship services.

In addition, the consulate provides help and assistance to Nigerians living within its area of jurisdiction. Such service may take the form of:
 provision of replacement travel documents
 advice and support in the case of an accident, serious illness, or death
 advice and support to victims of serious crime overseas, and arranging for next-of-kin to be informed
 visitation contact with incarcerated nationals
 liaison with local police officials in the case of nationals abducted or missing overseas
 loans to distressed travellers
 help during crises, such as civil unrest and natural disasters
 registering citizen births abroad
 provide a list of local doctors and lawyers for medical and/or legal issues
 supervising their flag vessels in foreign harbours

Passport services
Passport application is done online. There is no walk-in service. Applicants for biometric enrollment submit their applications online through the Nigerian Immigration Service website, after payment of the requisite fee. Application for a passport takes 10 weeks.

Visa services
Visa applicants submit their applications to the Nigeria Visa Application Centre operated by Thebez Global Resources Ltd (VFS partner) at Gartenstrasse 6, 60594 Frankfurt am Main or online.

Emergency Travel Certificate
Emergency Travel Certificate (ETC) is issued to stranded Nigerians overseas who lack the proper immigration status to return home. Only Nigerian citizens who lose their passports or who, due to unforeseeable circumstances, have exceeded their passport or visa expiration date are eligible for this consular service. This certificate enables them a one-way trip back to Nigeria, after which the document must be returned to immigration officials at the point of entry. Nigerians needing an ETC are required to send an application letter to the Consul General alongside a passport photograph, a copy of an expired or lost/stolen passport, a police report for a lost/stolen passport, self-addressed envelope with a stamp for return delivery. A designated fee is required.

In 2021, the Nigerian government launched a temporary passport to replace the Emergency Travel Certificate, with 30-day validity.

Citizenship services
The consulate also offers citizenship services which include age declaration, burial transit permits, change of profession, citizen identification and registration, and corporate registration.

Consulate Officials
The current officials at the mission are:
 Ambassador Wahab Adekola Akande (Consul General)
 Ajayi Olumide (Consul Consular)
 Valery Lapang (Consul ET & I)
 Ismail Ahmad Gusau (Head of Chancery)
 Enejoh Solomon (Consul PEC & I)
 Fatai Alao (Finance Attache)
 Libity Maina (Immigration Attache)

Consul Generals
The table shows a list of Consul Generals that have served in the Consulate General from its inauguration in 2013 to date.

Consular Holidays
The consulate observes all public holidays within the consular jurisdiction areas as well as all national public holidays in Germany and Nigeria, which includes Christian and Muslim holidays. The mission is not open to the public these days

See also 

 Germany–Nigeria relations
 Foreign relations of Nigeria
 Foreign relations of Germany

References

External links
 Official Consulate General of the Federal Republic of Nigeria, Frankfurt am Main, Germany website
 Official Ministry of Foreign Affairs, Nigeria website

Nigeria
Diplomatic missions in Frankfurt
Frankfurt am Main
Germany–Nigeria relations